Gfangen (also ) is a part of the Austrian town Pinkafeld in Burgenland, which has the postal code 7423.

Pinkafeld
Cities and towns in Oberwart District